The CEDEJ (Centre d'études et de documentation économiques, juridiques et sociales Eng.:Centre for Economic, Judicial, and Social Study and Documentation) is a French sponsored research center located in Cairo (Egypt), created in 1968. The Cedej has the status of a "Joint Entity of French Research Institutes Abroad" (UMIFRE, Unité Mixte des Instituts français de recherche à l’étranger) and is under the aegis of the French Ministry of Foreign Affairs and the CNRS (National Centre for Scientific Research). Karine Bennafla is its director since September 2015.

It has published numerous books and periodicals in all fields of social sciences in Egypt, the Sudan and the Arabic world. Among these, Egypte/Monde arabe, published from 1990, which is online in full text on the portal revues.org.

It offers a social sciences library (more than 35000 books, most of them in Arabic), a huge database of geolocated statistics, a complete collection of old and new maps of Egypt and its cities.

References

External links 

 This article is based on a translation of :fr:CEDEJ on French language Wikipedia.
 Cedej's website
 Egypte/Monde arabe website

1968 establishments in Egypt
Publishing companies established in 1968
Research institutes in Egypt
Science and technology in Egypt
Government agencies of France
Publishing companies of Egypt
Social sciences organizations
Mass media in Cairo